Konkola is an area of Zambia, near Chingola, on the border with  Congo. It has large copper reserves.

There is a copper smelter at Nchanga.

Konkola Copper Mines
Konkola Copper Mines established a major mine in the area; it is now controlled by Vedanta.

Konkola North
A new mine was started at Chililabombwe in October 2010; it is a joint venture between Vale and African Rainbow Minerals. Production is expected to reach 45000 tons of copper concentrate per year. Vale expects to export copper by rail through Mozambique.

References

Populated places in Copperbelt Province
Chililabombwe District